The Roraima mouse (Podoxymys roraimae) is a species of rodent in the family Cricetidae.  It is the only species in the genus Podoxymys.
It is found only in Guyana.

References

Sources

Akodontini
Mammals described in 1929
Taxonomy articles created by Polbot
Fauna of the Tepuis